{{DISPLAYTITLE:C21H20N4O3}}
The molecular formula C21H20N4O3 (molar mass: 376.41 g/mol, exact mass: 376.1535 u) may refer to:

 Entinostat (SNDX-275)
 Picotamide

Molecular formulas